Park Ji-young (born  January 25, 1969) is a South Korean actress. She starred in TV series such as The Woman Who Still Wants to Marry (2010), Romance Town (2011), The Fugitive of Joseon (2013), Tears of Heaven (2014), Don't Dare to Dream (2016) Moon Lovers: Scarlet Heart Ryeo (2016), Save me (2017), and The Red Sleeve (2021).

Filmography

Film

Television series

Web series

Awards and nominations

References

External links
 
 
 

1969 births
Living people
South Korean television actresses
South Korean film actresses
People from Jeonju
20th-century South Korean actresses
21st-century South Korean actresses